Carla Cristina Trindade Aco Correia (born 25 May 1974), known as Carla Cristina, is a Portuguese former footballer who played as a goalkeeper. She has been a member of the Portugal women's national team.

International career
On 15 November 2003, Carla Cristina conceded 13 goals in a UEFA Women's Euro 2005 qualifying match against Germany, who had just won the FIFA Women's World Cup the month before. That 0–13 loss is still the biggest defeat in Portugal women's national football team history.

References

1974 births
Living people
Portuguese women's footballers
Women's association football goalkeepers
Portugal women's international footballers